Labicolidae is a family of trematodes belonging to the order Plagiorchiida.

Genera:
 Labicola Blair, 1979

References

Plagiorchiida